Ajuy is a small remote fishing village on the west coast of Fuerteventura in the Canary Islands. It is part of the municipality Pájara. Not far from Ajuy is where the Norman Jean de Béthencourt landed in 1402 in order to conquer the island for the Spanish crown.

Puerto de la Peña is a small settlement of Ajuy that used to serve as a port of the old island capital of Betancuria. The port was later raided by pirates. Caleta Negra (Spanish for "Black Bay") lies 2 km from Ajuy. Near this bay there is an old lime kiln. The limestone from Ajuy was considered particularly pure and was shipped from this place up until the second half of the 19th century.
 
Ajuy is today a popular tourist excursion destination to visit the deep and dramatic caves carved into the softer parts of the limestone cliffs by ocean winter storms.

Demographics

Gallery

External links

 Ajuy, the hidden gem of the wild West Coast of Fuerteventura (in English)

References

Beaches of the Canary Islands
Populated places in Fuerteventura